NADH dehydrogenase [ubiquinone] iron-sulfur protein 8, mitochondrial also known as NADH-ubiquinone oxidoreductase 23 kDa subunit, Complex I-23kD (CI-23kD), or TYKY subunit is an enzyme that in humans is encoded by the NDUFS8 gene. The NDUFS8 protein is a subunit of NADH dehydrogenase (ubiquinone) also known as Complex I, which is located in the mitochondrial inner membrane and is the largest of the five complexes of the electron transport chain. Mutations in this gene have been associated with Leigh syndrome.

Structure 
NDUFS8 is located on the q arm of chromosome 11 in position 13.2. The NDUFS8 gene produces a 23.7 kDa protein composed of 210 amino acids. The encoded protein, TYKY, contains two 4Fe4S ferredoxin consensus patterns which are believed to be iron-sulfur cluster N-2 binding sites. Studies of other subunits of Complex I have suggested that the subunits TYKY, PSST, 49 kDa, ND1, and ND5 interact with iron-sulfur clusters to form the catalytic core of NADH dehydrogenase (ubiquinone).

Function 

This gene encodes a subunit of mitochondrial NADH:ubiquinone oxidoreductase, or Complex I, a multimeric enzyme of the respiratory chain responsible for NADH oxidation, ubiquinone reduction, and the ejection of protons from mitochondria. The encoded protein is involved in the binding of two of the six to eight iron-sulfur clusters of Complex I and, as such, is required in the electron transfer process.

Clinical significance 

Mutations in NDUFS8 have been associated with mitochondrial diseases, which can cause any one of a clinically heterogeneous group of disorders arising from dysfunction of the mitochondrial respiratory chain. The phenotypic spectrum ranges from isolated diseases affecting single organs to severe multisystem disorders. Common clinical features include ptosis, external ophthalmoplegia, proximal myopathy and exercise intolerance, cardiomyopathy, sensorineural deafness, optic atrophy, pigmentary retinopathy, encephalopathy, seizures, stroke-like episodes, ataxia, spasticity and lactic acidosis. Mitochondrial disorders can be caused by mutations of mitochondrial DNA or nuclear DNA that either affect oxidative phosphorylation proteins directly, or affect respiratory chain function by impacting the production of the complex machinery needed to run this process.

NDUFS8 mutations have also been associated with Leigh syndrome. Leigh syndrome is an early-onset progressive neurodegenerative disorder characterized by the presence of focal, bilateral lesions in one or more areas of the central nervous system including the brainstem, thalamus, basal ganglia, cerebellum and spinal cord. Clinical features depend on which areas of the central nervous system are involved and include subacute onset of psychomotor retardation, hypotonia, ataxia, weakness, vision loss, eye movement abnormalities, seizures, dysphagia and lactic acidosis. One case report of a pathogenic mutation in NDUFS8 found that it resulted in complex I mitochondrial deficiency and a diagnosis of Leigh syndrome. The patient’s symptoms included apnea, cyanosis, hypercarbia, hypotonia, brisk tendon reflexes, ankle clonus, and erratic seizures. Further analysis revealed increased lactate, cerebral lesions, and a hypertrophic obstructive cardiomyopathy.

Interactions 

In addition to co-subunits for complex I, NDUFS8 has protein-protein interactions with MLH1 and GEM.

References

Further reading

External links 
 
 

Human proteins
EC 1.6.5
EC 1.6.99